Indotipula is a genus of true crane fly.

Distribution
Asia

Species

I. acentrota (Edwards, 1932)
I. angustilobata (Alexander, 1932)
I. apicidilata (Alexander, 1964)
I. audcentiana (Alexander, 1966)
I. belingana (Alexander, 1966)
I. blandita (Alexander, 1953)
I. brachycantha (Alexander, 1949)
I. brevivittata (Edwards, 1932)
I. chandra (Alexander, 1971)
I. cinctoterminalis (Brunetti, 1912)
I. demarcata (Brunetti, 1911)
I. diacaena (Alexander, 1961)
I. dilatistyla (Alexander, 1949)
I. divisa (Brunetti, 1911)
I. elegantula (Brunetti, 1912)
I. fuscoangustata (Alexander, 1930)
I. gedehicola (Alexander, 1915)
I. gracilis (Brunetti, 1911)
I. gupta (Alexander, 1961)
I. gurneyana (Alexander, 1978)
I. ifugao (Alexander, 1932)
I. itoana (Alexander, 1955)
I. kinabaluensis (Edwards, 1933)
I. korinchiensis (Edwards, 1919)
I. laffooniana (Alexander, 1971)
I. latilobata (Alexander, 1932)
I. leucopyga (van der Wulp, 1885)
I. malaica (Edwards, 1932)
I. manobo (Alexander, 1932)
I. melacantha (Alexander, 1961)
I. melanodonta (Alexander, 1978)
I. mendax (Alexander, 1924)
I. nigrinervis (Edwards, 1927)
I. nudicaudata (Edwards, 1932)
I. okinawensis (Alexander, 1932)
I. palnica (Edwards, 1932)
I. pandava (Alexander, 1961)
I. peusiana (Alexander, 1966)
I. prolata (Alexander, 1961)
I. pugionis (Alexander, 1961)
I. quadrispicata (Alexander, 1933)
I. querella (Alexander, 1948)
I. riverai (Alexander, 1927)
I. serritergata (Alexander, 1947)
I. simlensis (Edwards, 1932)
I. sinabangensis (de Meijere, 1916)
I. singhalica (Alexander & Alexander, 1973)
I. stylacuta (Alexander, 1971)
I. subdilata (Alexander, 1961)
I. subvaruna (Alexander, 1971)
I. sudra (Alexander, 1961)
I. suensoni (Alexander, 1925)
I. tetracantha (Alexander, 1928)
I. tetradolos (Alexander, 1970)
I. tjibodensis (Alexander, 1915)
I. tukvarensis (Edwards, 1932)
I. ubensis (Alexander, 1932)
I. varuna (Alexander, 1961)
I. vilis (Walker, 1856)
I. walkeri (Brunetti, 1911)
I. wulpiana (Alexander, 1968)
I. yamata (Alexander, 1914)

References

Tipulidae
Diptera of Asia
Taxa named by Enrico Adelelmo Brunetti